Soufari Sarai is a large historical building in the castle of Ioannina, Greece. It was used by the Ottomans as a cavalry school. It is located on the north side of the Castle, near the Turkish Library. It is a large rectangular building with two floors of  each. It was built between 1815 and 1820 by Ali Pasha. It has been restored, and is used by the State Archives.

References

Buildings and structures completed in 1820
Ottoman architecture in Ioannina
Barracks
19th-century architecture in Greece